Guggenheim is a surname.  Notable people with the name include:

 Guggenheim family, American family of Swiss Jewish ancestry
 Meyer Guggenheim (1828–1905)
 Daniel Guggenheim (1856–1930)
 Harry Frank Guggenheim  who privately funded Goddard's liquid fuel rocket research (1890–1971)
 Solomon R. Guggenheim (1861–1949), philanthropist who established the Guggenheim museum
 Benjamin Guggenheim (1865–1912)
 Peggy Guggenheim (1898–1979)
 Simon Guggenheim (1867–1941)
 Charles Guggenheim (1924–2002), American Academy Award-winning documentary film maker
 Davis Guggenheim (born 1963), American Academy Award-winning documentary film maker
 Edward A. Guggenheim (1901–1970), English chemist and academic noted for chemical thermodynamics
 Paul Guggenheim (1899–1977), Swiss scholar of international law
 Ralph Guggenheim (born 1951), American video graphics designer and businessman

Jewish surnames
Yiddish-language surnames